"Human Beings" is a song by Seal. It was released as the lead single from his third studio album, Human Being.

Charts

References

1998 singles
1998 songs
Seal (musician) songs
Songs written by Mark Batson
Songs written by Seal (musician)